Solomon Ndubisi Okoronkwo (born 2 March 1987) is a Nigerian footballer who plays for German sixth-tier Berlin-Liga club Berlin Türkspor.

Career
He was discovered in 2004 by FIFA agent Marcelo Houseman, who got his guardianship and took him to Hertha BSC. In October 2004, his agent recommended Okoronkwo to coach Samson Siasia and he was fundamental for Nigeria's U-20 qualifying for the African Youth Championship in Benin 2005. He was also on the Nigerian Under 23 team that won silver at the 2008 Beijing Olympics. Okoronkwo was called up for his first senior cap in October 2008 by Nigeria coach Shaibu Amodu.

On 28 January 2011, Okoronkwo moved to Aalesund in the Norwegian Premier League.

Career statistics

References

External links
 
 
 Solomon Okoronkwo at Kicker
 

1987 births
Living people
Nigerian footballers
Nigerian expatriate footballers
Nigeria international footballers
Nigeria under-20 international footballers
Footballers at the 2008 Summer Olympics
Olympic footballers of Nigeria
Olympic silver medalists for Nigeria
Olympic medalists in football
Pepsi Football Academy players
Ifeanyi Ubah F.C. players
Hertha BSC players
Rot-Weiss Essen players
FC Saturn Ramenskoye players
Aalesunds FK players
Pécsi MFC players
FC Erzgebirge Aue players
SV Sandhausen players
1. FC Saarbrücken players
TSG Neustrelitz players
Berliner FC Dynamo players
BSV Schwarz-Weiß Rehden players
Hannoverscher SC players
Russian Premier League players
Bundesliga players
2. Bundesliga players
Nemzeti Bajnokság I players
Expatriate footballers in Germany
Expatriate footballers in Russia
Expatriate footballers in Norway
Expatriate footballers in Hungary
Nigerian expatriate sportspeople in Germany
Nigerian expatriate sportspeople in Russia
Nigerian expatriate sportspeople in Norway
Nigerian expatriate sportspeople in Hungary
Medalists at the 2008 Summer Olympics
Eliteserien players
Association football forwards
Footballers from Enugu